The 2013–14 Israeli Women's Cup (Gvia HaMedina Nashim) was the 16th season of Israel's women's nationwide football cup competition.

The competition was won by ASA Tel Aviv University who had beaten Maccabi Kishronot Hadera 2–1 in the final.

Results

First round

Quarter-finals

Semi-finals

Final

References

External links
2013–14 State Cup Women Israeli Football Association 

Israel Women's Cup seasons
cup
Israel